1-800-NEW-FUNK is a compilation album by Prince's NPG Records, meant to showcase artists signed to the record label.  It was released on July 20, 1994. The title of the album was also a toll-free phone number in North America for customers to purchase Prince-related merchandise. Some tracks are from albums that actually saw release either through Prince's previous label, Paisley Park Records or through NPG Records, while others appear only on this compilation.

There were two German releases to this CD; the first release was issued with the reference NPG 6051-2 and is missing artwork from the Steeles album in the liner notes. The second release, reference 0060512NPG, includes an image of the Steeles album cover artwork.

Track listing

Singles
 The Nona Gaye/Prince track "Love Sign" was released to radio in June 1994.
 Margie Cox's "Standing at the Altar" was also released as a single.

Reviews
Entertainment Weekly said that as a showcase of Prince's label, Paisley Park Records, the album "amounts to unintentional evidence of why the company failed."  They rated the album "C+".  The Independent, describing the record as a "stop-gap compilation of Princely offshoots", cited Nona Gaye's contributions as being "of primary interest", saying she "displays a slinky sensitivity without the overt sensuality of her father or her producer".

References

1994 compilation albums
Albums produced by Prince (musician)
NPG Records compilation albums
Record label compilation albums